The Central Bank of Cuba (BCC) is the central bank of Cuba.  It was created in 1997 to take over many of the functions of the National Bank of Cuba, which was established on 23 December 1948 and had begun operations on 27 April 1950.

The current president of the bank is Joaquín Alonso Vázquez.

Organization

The bank is headed by a single president with five vice-presidents:

 First Vice President
 Administrative Vice President
 Vice President, Analysis and Strategic Objectives of the Cuban Bank System 
 Vice President, Macroeconomics 
 Vice-president, Operations

The president of the Central Bank is a member of the Council of Ministers of Cuba.

Presidents

Presidents of the National Bank of Cuba and of the Central Bank of Cuba. 
Felipe Pazos, 1950 – April 1952
Joaquín Martínez Sáenz, April 1952 – 1958
Felipe Pazos, January 1959 – November 1959
Che Guevara, 26 November 1959 – 1961
Raúl Cepero Bonilla, 1961–1962
Orlando Pérez Rodríguez, 1962 – 1973
Raúl León Torrás, 1973 – 1985
Héctor Rodríguez Llompart, 1985 – 1995
Francisco Soberón Valdés, 1995 – 2009
Ernesto Medina Villaveiran, 2009 – 2017
Irma Margarita Martínez Castrillón, 2017 – 2020
Marta Sabina Wilson González, 2020-2023
Joaquín Alonso Vázquez Since 15 February 2023

See also

Ministry of Finance and Prices
 Banco Nacional de Cuba v. Sabbatino
 Banking in Cuba
 Central banks and currencies of the Caribbean
 Cuban convertible peso

References

External links
  Central Bank of Cuba official site

Banks of Cuba
Cuba
Economy of Cuba
Banks established in 1997
1997 establishments in Cuba